Novosphingobium hassiacum  is a Gram-negative bacterium from the genus Novosphingobium which has been isolated from a sewage pond in Germany.

References

Further reading

External links
Type strain of Novosphingobium hassiacum at BacDive -  the Bacterial Diversity Metadatabase	

Bacteria described in 2002
Sphingomonadales